Jhirkuni is a village in Barakot Tahsil, Champawat district, Uttarakhand, India.

Jhirkuni has a famous Bhumiya Devta Mandir surrounded by another devi devta mandir. At one time Jhirkuni used to have more than 300 families in the village. Jhirkuni Gram sabha used to cover all the way from jhirkuni until Nigali Gaad while covering Taandi, Taak, Kabarkot, Ovani, Nadera, Bhatwad, Suri, Gaad. In the past, this used to be the main route for travelers before the roads were constructed.

Jhirkuni gaon also has a primary school. However, only few students attend the school.

References

Villages in Champawat district